The Théâtre des Muses is a theatre in Monaco.

Location
The theatre is located at 45A Boulevard du Jardin Exotique near the Jardin Exotique de Monaco, in the Moneghetti neighbourhood of Monaco.

History
The building was initially a bakery, inherited by Anthéa Sogno, a Monegasque stage actress whose great-grandfather had acquired the building in 1930. Sogno remodelled the bakery into a theatre for three years, turning the old baker's oven into the theatre hall. She designed it in a style reminiscent of the Belle Époque. 

The new theatre was dedicated in 2012.

References

External links

Theatres in Monaco
Theatres completed in 2012